Benjamin Martin Karl (born 16 October 1985) is an Austrian snowboarder with seven World Cup victories and one FIS World Ski Championships Victory.

He competed for his nation in the 2010 Winter Olympics in Parallel Giant Slalom, coming in second to Jasey Jay Anderson.

He won the bronze medal in Parallel slalom at the 2014 Winter Olympics and finally became the Olympic champion in Parallel Giant Slalom at the 2022 Winter Olympics.

References

External links

Snowboarders at the 2010 Winter Olympics
Snowboarders at the 2014 Winter Olympics
Snowboarders at the 2018 Winter Olympics
Snowboarders at the 2022 Winter Olympics
Olympic snowboarders of Austria
Austrian male snowboarders
1985 births
Living people
Olympic gold medalists for Austria
Olympic silver medalists for Austria
Olympic bronze medalists for Austria
Olympic medalists in snowboarding
Medalists at the 2010 Winter Olympics
Medalists at the 2014 Winter Olympics
Medalists at the 2022 Winter Olympics
People from Sankt Pölten
Sportspeople from Lower Austria